Shaghik is a village in the Amasia Municipality of the Shirak Province of Armenia.

Demographics 
According to 1912 publication of Kavkazskiy kalendar, there were was a mainly Karapapakh population of 373 in the village of Karabulag of the Kars Okrug of the Kars Oblast.

The population of the village since 1886 is as follows:

References

External links 

Populated places in Shirak Province